The Yudoma  is a river in eastern Siberia in the Yudoma-Maya Highlands near the Okhotsk Coast.  It joins the Maya which joins the Aldan which joins the Lena which flows into the Arctic Ocean. Its northern headwaters are in the Suntar-Khayata Range. To the east is the Yudoma Range and then the Okhota, to the south the Maya and to the northwest, the Allakh-Yun, another tributary of the Aldan.

Geography
It is fed by snowmelt and summer rains. It is frozen from mid-October to late May. The lower  are considered navigable. The Yudoma limits the southern end of the Ulakhan-Bom range.

Infrastructure and local economy
The area is largely unsettled and there is hardly any infrastructure. The only significant settlement is Yugoryonok.

It is formed from the junction of two rivers, one of which flows from a glacier. At the 'corner' began the long Okhotsk Portage which ran east-southeast to the Okhota River. About  further was Yudoma Cross from which the Yudoma Portage led southeast to the Urak River and a longer horse track led to Urak Landing. North of Yudoma Cross a horse track led to Yakutsk. Near here the border between the Sakha Republic and Khabarovsk Krai joins the Yudoma and follows it to its mouth.

The Yudoma was one of the river routes to the Okhotsk Coast. Because of its rapids and swift current there was a great deal of tracking (see portage). Rapids and cataracts blocked the larger boats that were used on the Maya. In 1737 Stepan Krasheninnikov took three days to go downstream from Yudoma Cross to the Maya, whereas it took five to six weeks to make the same trip upstream.

See also
Yudoma-Maya Highlands

References

James R Gibson, "Feeding the Russian Fur Trade: Provisionment of the Okhotsk Seaboard and the Kamchatka Peninsula, 1639-1856, 1969

Rivers of the Sakha Republic
Rivers of Khabarovsk Krai
Suntar-Khayata